Mount Gibson Sanctuary is a  nature reserve on the northern edge of the Wheatbelt and the southern margin of uncleared rangeland country,  north-east of Perth in mid-west Western Australia.  The nearest large town is Dalwallinu.  It is in the Avon-Wheatbelt Bioregion and is owned and managed by the Australian Wildlife Conservancy (AWC).

History
Mount Gibson is a former pastoral lease, first granted in 1915 and used mainly for sheep grazing.  More recently it was managed for its environmental values.  It was acquired by AWC in 2001.  Current programs include removal and control of feral animals, rehabilitation of degraded areas, and wildfire management.

Landscape and climate
Mount Gibson contains rocky ranges, floodplains, claypans, salt-lakes and sand-plains. The climate is semi-arid with winter rainfall and hot, dry summers.

Ecosystems
Floristically, Mount Gibson contains elements of both the south-west region and the arid zone, due to its transitional location on the mulga-eucalypt line.  Much of the reserve is dominated by Wheatbelt flora, largely cleared elsewhere, including extensive eucalypt woodlands, with stands of salmon gum, York gum and gimlet.

Fauna
Both red and western grey kangaroos are found on the reserve, emphasizing the transitional nature of its location.  Other mammals are Mitchell's hopping mouse and the little long-tailed dunnart.  Significant bird species include malleefowl, Major Mitchell's cockatoo and regent parrot.  An indicator of floristic richness is a collection of over 100 species of native bees on the property.

Important Bird Area
The sanctuary, along with the neighbouring Charles Darwin Reserve, forms part of the  Mount Gibson and Charles Darwin Important Bird Area (IBA), so identified by BirdLife International principally because it supports populations of malleefowl and western corellas, as well as several other species restricted to either the arid or mallee biomes.

See also
 Mount Gibson, Western Australia

References

External links
 Australian Wildlife Conservancy

Nature reserves in Western Australia
Australian Wildlife Conservancy reserves
Shire of Yalgoo
Important Bird Areas of Western Australia
2001 establishments in Australia